A synchrotron is a particular type of cyclic particle accelerator, descended from the cyclotron, in which the accelerating particle beam travels around a fixed closed-loop path.  The magnetic field which bends the particle beam into its closed path increases with time during the accelerating process, being synchronized to the increasing kinetic energy of the particles. The synchrotron is one of the first accelerator concepts to enable the construction of large-scale facilities, since bending, beam focusing and acceleration can be separated into different components.  The most powerful modern particle accelerators use versions of the synchrotron design.  The largest synchrotron-type accelerator, also the largest particle accelerator in the world, is the  Large Hadron Collider (LHC) near Geneva, Switzerland, built in 2008 by the European Organization for Nuclear Research (CERN).  It can accelerate beams of protons to an energy of 6.5 tera electronvolts (TeV or 1012 eV).

The synchrotron principle was invented by Vladimir Veksler in 1944. Edwin McMillan constructed the first electron synchrotron in 1945, arriving at the idea independently, having missed Veksler's publication (which was only available in a Soviet journal, although in English). The first proton synchrotron was designed by Sir Marcus Oliphant and built in 1952.

Types 

Several specialized types of synchrotron machines are used today:
A storage ring is a special type of synchrotron in which the kinetic energy of the particles is kept constant.
A synchrotron light source is a combination of different electron accelerator types, including a storage ring in which the desired electromagnetic radiation is generated. This radiation is then used in experimental stations located on different beamlines. In addition to the storage ring, a synchrotron light source usually contains a linear accelerator (linac) and another synchrotron which is sometimes called a booster in this context. The linac and the booster are used to successively accelerate the electrons to their final energy before they are magnetically "kicked" into the storage ring. Synchrotron light sources in their entirety are sometimes called "synchrotrons", although this is technically incorrect.
A cyclic collider is also a combination of different accelerator types, including two intersecting storage rings and the respective pre-accelerators.

Principle of operation 
The synchrotron evolved from the cyclotron, the first cyclic particle accelerator. While a classical cyclotron uses both a constant guiding magnetic field and a constant-frequency electromagnetic field (and is working in classical approximation), its successor, the isochronous cyclotron, works by local variations of the guiding magnetic field, adapting to the increasing relativistic mass of particles during acceleration.

In a synchrotron, this adaptation is done by variation of the magnetic field strength in time, rather than in space. For particles that are not close to the speed of light, the frequency of the applied electromagnetic field may also change to follow their non-constant circulation time. By increasing these parameters accordingly as the particles gain energy, their circulation path can be held constant as they are accelerated. This allows the vacuum chamber for the particles to be a large thin torus, rather than a disk as in previous, compact accelerator designs. Also, the thin profile of the vacuum chamber allowed for a more efficient use of magnetic fields than in a cyclotron, enabling the cost-effective construction of larger synchrotrons.

While the first synchrotrons and storage rings like the Cosmotron and ADA strictly used the toroid shape, the strong focusing principle independently discovered by Ernest Courant et al. and Nicholas Christofilos allowed the complete separation of the accelerator into components with specialized functions along the particle path, shaping the path into a round-cornered polygon. Some important components are given by radio frequency cavities for direct acceleration, dipole magnets (bending magnets) for deflection of particles (to close the path), and quadrupole / sextupole magnets for beam focusing.

The combination of time-dependent guiding magnetic fields and the strong focusing principle enabled the design and operation of modern large-scale accelerator facilities like colliders and synchrotron light sources. The straight sections along the closed path in such facilities are not only required for radio frequency cavities, but also for particle detectors (in colliders) and photon generation devices such as wigglers and undulators (in third generation synchrotron light sources).

The maximum energy that a cyclic accelerator can impart is typically limited by the maximum strength of the magnetic fields and the minimum radius (maximum curvature) of the particle path. Thus one method for increasing the energy limit is to use superconducting magnets, these not being limited by magnetic saturation. Electron/positron accelerators may also be limited by the emission of synchrotron radiation, resulting in a partial loss of the particle beam's kinetic energy. The limiting beam energy is reached when the energy lost to the lateral acceleration required to maintain the beam path in a circle equals the energy added each cycle.

More powerful accelerators are built by using large radius paths and by using more numerous and more powerful microwave cavities. Lighter particles (such as electrons) lose a larger fraction of their energy when deflected. Practically speaking, the energy of electron/positron accelerators is limited by this radiation loss, while this does not play a significant role in the dynamics of proton or ion accelerators. The energy of such accelerators is limited strictly by the strength of magnets and by the cost.

Injection procedure 
Unlike in a cyclotron, synchrotrons are unable to accelerate particles from zero kinetic energy; one of the obvious reasons for this is that its closed particle path would be cut by a device that emits particles. Thus, schemes were developed to inject pre-accelerated particle beams into a synchrotron. The pre-acceleration can be realized by a chain of other accelerator structures like a linac, a microtron or another synchrotron; all of these in turn need to be fed by a particle source comprising a simple high voltage power supply, typically a Cockcroft-Walton generator.

Starting from an appropriate initial value determined by the injection energy, the field strength of the dipole magnets is then increased. If the high energy particles are emitted at the end of the acceleration procedure, e.g. to a target or to another accelerator, the field strength is again decreased to injection level, starting a new injection cycle. Depending on the method of magnet control used, the time interval for one cycle can vary substantially between different installations.

In large-scale facilities 

One of the early large synchrotrons, now retired, is the Bevatron, constructed in 1950 at the Lawrence Berkeley Laboratory. The name of this proton accelerator comes from its power, in the range of 6.3 GeV (then called BeV for billion electron volts; the name predates the adoption of the SI prefix giga-). A number of transuranium elements, unseen in the natural world, were first created with this machine. This site is also the location of one of the first large bubble chambers used to examine the results of the atomic collisions produced here.

Another early large synchrotron is the Cosmotron built at Brookhaven National Laboratory which reached 3.3 GeV in 1953.

Among the few synchrotrons around the world, 16 are located in the United States. Many of them belong to national laboratories; few are located in universities.

As part of colliders 
Until August 2008, the highest energy collider in the world was the Tevatron, at the Fermi National Accelerator Laboratory, in the United States. It accelerated protons and antiprotons to slightly less than 1 TeV of kinetic energy and collided them together. The Large Hadron Collider (LHC), which has been built at the European Laboratory for High Energy Physics (CERN), has roughly seven times this energy (so proton-proton collisions occur at roughly 14 TeV). It is housed in the 27 km tunnel which formerly housed the Large Electron Positron (LEP) collider, so it will maintain the claim as the largest scientific device ever built. The LHC will also accelerate heavy ions (such as lead) up to an energy of 1.15 PeV.

The largest device of this type seriously proposed was the Superconducting Super Collider (SSC), which was to be built in the United States. This design, like others, used superconducting magnets which allow more intense magnetic fields to be created without the limitations of core saturation. While construction was begun, the project was cancelled in 1994, citing excessive budget overruns — this was due to naïve cost estimation and economic management issues rather than any basic engineering flaws. It can also be argued that the end of the Cold War resulted in a change of scientific funding priorities that contributed to its ultimate cancellation. However, the tunnel built for its placement still remains, although empty. 
While there is still potential for yet more powerful proton and heavy particle cyclic accelerators, it appears that the next step up in electron beam energy must avoid losses due to synchrotron radiation. This will require a return to the linear accelerator, but with devices significantly longer than those currently in use. There is at present a major effort to design and build the International Linear Collider (ILC), which will consist of two opposing linear accelerators, one for electrons and one for positrons. These will collide at a total center of mass energy of 0.5 TeV.

As part of synchrotron light sources 

Synchrotron radiation also has a wide range of applications (see synchrotron light) and many 2nd and 3rd generation synchrotrons have been built especially to harness it. The largest of those 3rd generation synchrotron light sources are the European Synchrotron Radiation Facility (ESRF) in Grenoble, France, the Advanced Photon Source (APS) near Chicago, USA, and SPring-8 in Japan, accelerating electrons up to 6, 7 and 8 GeV, respectively.

Synchrotrons which are useful for cutting edge research are large machines, costing tens or hundreds of millions of dollars to construct, and each beamline (there may be 20 to 50 at a large synchrotron) costs another two or three million dollars on average. These installations are mostly built by the science funding agencies of governments of developed countries, or by collaborations between several countries in a region, and operated as infrastructure facilities available to scientists from universities and research organisations throughout the country, region, or world. More compact models, however, have been developed, such as the Compact Light Source.

Applications
 Life sciences: protein and large-molecule crystallography
 LIGA based microfabrication
 Drug discovery and research
 X-ray lithography

 X-ray microtomography
 Analysing chemicals to determine their composition
 Observing the reaction of living cells to drugs
 Inorganic material crystallography and microanalysis
 Fluorescence studies
 Semiconductor material analysis and structural studies
 Geological material analysis
 Medical imaging
 Particle therapy to treat some forms of cancer
 Radiometry: calibration of detectors and radiometric standards

See also

 List of synchrotron radiation facilities
 Synchrotron radiation
 Cyclotron radiation
 Computed X-ray tomography
 Energy amplifier
 Superconducting radio frequency
 Coherent diffraction imaging

References

External links

ESRF (European Synchrotron Radiation Facility)
National Synchrotron Radiation Research Center (NSRRC) in Taiwan
Elettra Sincrotrone Trieste - Elettra and Fermi lightsources
Canadian Light Source
Australian Synchrotron
French synchrotron Soleil
Diamond UK Synchrotron
Lightsources.org
IAEA database of electron synchrotron and storage rings
CERN Large Hadron Collider
Synchrotron Light Sources of the World
A Miniature Synchrotron: room-size synchrotron offers scientists a new way to perform high-quality x-ray experiments in their own labs, Technology Review, February 4, 2008
Brazilian Synchrotron Light Laboratory
Podcast interview with a scientist at the European Synchrotron Radiation Facility
Indian SRS
Spanish ALBA Light Source
The tabletop synchrotron MIRRORCLE
SOLARIS synchrotron in Poland

Accelerator physics
Synchrotron-related techniques
Particle accelerators